John Dotyn was an Oxford college head in the 16th century.

Dotyn was  educated at Exeter College, Oxford, graduating B.A. in 1524 and M.A. in 1529. He was appointed a Fellow of Exeter in 1528; and was Rector from 1537 to 1539. A priest, he held the livings at Bampton, St Issey, Whitstone, Aveton Gifford, and Kingsdon. He died on 7 November 1561.

References

Alumni of Exeter College, Oxford
Rectors of Exeter College, Oxford
16th-century English people
Fellows of Exeter College, Oxford
1561 deaths